This is a listing of recipients of the Boy Scouts of America Order of the Arrow's Distinguished Service Award (DSA).  See Honors and awards of the Order of the Arrow for a description of the DSA.

Recipients
 1940 - 11 Recipients

 1942 - 3 Recipients - 14 Total

 1946 - 6 Recipients - 20 Total

 1948 - 3 Recipients - 23 Total

 1950 - 3 Recipients - 26 Total

 1952 - 10 Recipients - 36 Total

 1954 - 8 Recipients - 44 Total

 1956 - 11 Recipients - 55 Total

 1958 - 12 Recipients - 67 Total

 1961 - 16 Recipients - 83 Total

 1963 - 14 Recipients - 97 Total

 1965 - 16 Recipients - 113 Total

 1967 - 15 Recipients - 128 Total

 1969 - 16 Recipients - 144 Total

 1971 - 21 Recipients - 165 Total

 1973 - 24 Recipients - 189 Total

 1975 - 24 Recipients - 213 Total

 1977 - 29 Recipients - 242 Total

 1979 - 30 Recipients - 272 Total

 1981 - 39 Recipients - 311 Total

 1983 - 43 Recipients - 354 Total

 1986 - 49 Recipients - 403 Total

 1988 - 48 Recipients - 451 Total

 1990 - 37 Recipients - 488 Total

 1992 - 37 Recipients - 525 Total

 1994 - 36 Recipients - 561 Total

 1996 - 37 Recipients - 598 Total

 1998 - 37 Recipients - 635 Total

 2000 - 36 Recipients - 671 Total

 2002 - 38 Recipients - 709 Total

 2004 - 42 Recipients - 751 Total

 2006 - 39 Recipients - 790 Total

 2009 - 49 Recipients - 839 Total

 2012 - 69 Recipients - 908 Total

 2015 - 57 Recipients - 965 Total 

 2018 - 54 Recipients - 1019 Total 

 2020 - 53 Recipients - 1072 Total 

 2022 - 53 Recipients - 1125 Total

References

Order of the Arrow
Advancement and recognition in the Boy Scouts of America
Distinguished service awards